Estehkam (also Romanized as Esteḩkām; also known as Esteḩkām-e Jonūbī, Estekān, and Estīkān) is a village in Takab Rural District, Shahdad District, Kerman County, Kerman Province, Iran. At the 2006 census, its population was 338, in 79 families.

References 

Populated places in Kerman County